(from Okayama, Japan 1896–1967) was a potter in Imbe, Japan.  He helped to establish the Japan Kōgei Association in 1955, and was deemed a living national treasure in 1956 for his work in the Bizen style ceramics.
He was a member of what is known as the "Momoyama revival movement" of the 1930s and is credited with having rediscovered the techniques used to produce the wabi teawares of the Azuchi-Momoyama period.

References

External links
 http://www.e-yakimono.net/html/momoyama-revival-jt.html

Japanese potters
People from Okayama Prefecture
1967 deaths
1896 births
Living National Treasures of Japan
20th-century ceramists
19th-century Japanese people
20th-century Japanese people